Le Mans Football Club (commonly referred to as Le Mans FC, formerly referred as Le Muc) is a French association football club based in Le Mans. The club was founded in 1985 as a result of a merger under the name Le Mans Union Club 72. In 2010, Le Mans changed its name to Le Mans FC to coincide with the re-modeling of the club, which includes moving into a new stadium, MMArena, which opened in January 2011. The stadium is based in the interior of the famous circuit in the city.

The club were controversially relegated from 2019–20 Ligue 2 when the season was terminated early due to the COVID-19 pandemic.

History 
Le Mans Sports Club were founded in 1900, but it was not until 1908 that a football club existed within it. In 1910, Le Mans qualified for the Championnat de la France in 1910, but were heavily overturned by Saint-Servan. Gaining a huge reputation up to World War I, Le Mans SC plunged into obscurity by World War II before joining the war league in 1942.

The football section of Union Sportive du Mans was founded in 1903.

The current club was formed as a result of a merger between Union Sportive du Mans and Le Mans Sports Club, on 12 June 1985. Upon its foundation, former football player Bernard Deferrez was installed as manager. Le Mans UC spent the majority of its infancy in Ligue 2. In the 2003–04 season, the club achieved promotion to Ligue 1 for the first time, but were immediately relegated. Le Mans returned to the first division for the 2005–06 season and successfully remained in the league for the next four seasons. The club suffered relegation back to Ligue 2 in the 2009–10 season. Midway through the campaign, on 2 December 2009, Le Mans announced that it was changing its name from Le Mans Union Club 72 to Le Mans FC.

Le Mans moved to the MMArena midway through the 2010–11 season, comfortably in the promotion spots for a return to Ligue 1, but a bad run sees them finish 4th, missing promotion on goal difference. The failure to achieve promotion is costly, as the club sees its payroll limited by the DNCG. Many players leave, and relegation is only narrowly avoided. The club survives by appeal an attempt by DNCG to relegate them to Championnat National. The following season they are relegated on the field, and a long summer of legal battles sees them liquidated and reforming in Maine (province) Division d'Honneur as an amateur club.

Promotion to Championnat de France Amateur 2 was achieved on the first attempt, and promotion from that division was only narrowly missed in 2014–15 and 2015–16. On the third attempt, promotion to the new Championnat National 2 was obtained in 2016–17, when Le Mans finished as one of the best runners up in the competition. Le Mans was promoted for the second season in a row winning Group D and being promoted to the 2018–19 Championnat National, the club would achieve a third consecutive promotion after successfully overcoming Gazélec Ajaccio in the Ligue 2 relegation play-off final with a 3-2 aggregate score, swapping places with the Corsican club who, only three years before had been members of the top-flight themselves.

The club were in 19th place in Ligue 2 when the season was terminated early due to the COVID-19 pandemic. Despite the club supporting an LFP proposal which would have seen Ligue 2 operate temporarily with 22 clubs, meaning they would stay in the division, the FFF ruled on 27 May 2020 that they were to be relegated to Championnat National.

Players

Current squad 
As of 5 February 2023.

Out on loan

Notable players 
Below are the notable former players who have represented Le Mans and its predecessors in league and international competition since the club's foundation in 1985. To appear in the section below, a player must have played in at least 100 official matches for the club.

For a complete list of Le Mans players, see :Category:Le Mans FC players

 Ludovic Baal
 Dagui Bakari
 Ismaël Bangoura
 Marko Baša
 Régis Beunardeau
 Laurent Bonnart
 Grégory Cerdan
 Sébastien Corchia
 Daniel Cousin
 Mathieu Coutadeur
 Tulio De Melo
 Didier Drogba
 Dan Eggen
 Patrick Ekeng Ekeng
 James Fanchone
 Yannick Fischer
 Thierry Froger
 Eric Garcin
 Gervinho
 Grafite
 Yohan Hautcoeur
 Thorstein Helstad
 Roland Lamah
 Anthony Le Tallec
 Modibo Maïga
 Daisuke Matsui
 Didier Ovono
 Fabrice Pancrate
 Olivier Pédémas
 Yohann Pelé
 Christian Penaud
 Yoann Poulard
 Romaric
 Stéphane Samson
 Morgan Sanson
 Stéphane Sessègnon
 Jacques Songo'o
 Fredrik Strømstad
 Frédéric Thomas
 Olivier Thomas
 Olivier Thomert
 Patrick Van Kets
 Hassan Yebda
 Zito

Former managers

Honours 
 Division d'Honneur Ouest
 Winners: 1961, 1965
 Division d'Honneur Maine
Winners: 2014
 Coupe Gambardella
 Winners: 2004

References 

 
Association football clubs established in 1985
1985 establishments in France
Football clubs in Pays de la Loire
Ligue 1 clubs